Gopala Gopala may refer to any of the following films:

Gopala Gopala (1996 film), a 1996 Tamil comedy film featuring Pandiarajan and Kushboo in lead roles
Gopala Gopala (2015 film), a 2015 Telugu satirical drama film featuring Pawan Kalyan and Daggubati Venkatesh in lead roles